Lamphere is a surname. Notable people with the surname include:

Louise Lamphere (born 1940), American anthropologist
Robert J. Lamphere (1918–2002), American intelligence agent

See also
 Lamphere Public Schools

English-language surnames